Arvid A. Andersson-Holtman (20 December 1896 – 28 January 1992) was a Swedish gymnast who competed in the 1920 Summer Olympics. He was born in Ekerö, Uppland. He was part of the Swedish team, which was able to win the gold medal in the gymnastics men's team, Swedish system event in 1920.

References

1896 births
1992 deaths
People from Ekerö Municipality
Swedish male artistic gymnasts
Gymnasts at the 1920 Summer Olympics
Olympic gymnasts of Sweden
Olympic gold medalists for Sweden
Olympic medalists in gymnastics
Medalists at the 1920 Summer Olympics
Sportspeople from Stockholm County
20th-century Swedish people